This is a list of Members of Parliament (MPs) elected to the 8th Parliament of the Jatiya Sangsad, the National Parliament of Bangladesh, by Bangladeshi constituencies. The list includes both MPs elected at the 2001 general election, held on 1 October 2001, and nominated women's members for reserved seats and those subsequently elected in by-elections.

Members

Elected members of parliament

Women members of parliament

References

Members of the Jatiya Sangsad by term
2001 establishments in Bangladesh
Bangladesh
8th Jatiya Sangsad members
Jatiya Sangsad